Patriarch Filaret may refer to:
Patriarch Filaret (Feodor Romanov) (1553–1633) of Moscow and all Rus
Patriarch Filaret (Mykhailo Denysenko) (1929-) of Ukrainian Orthodox Church, Kiev Patriarchy, former Metropolitan of Kiev & All Ukraine of Russian Orthodox Church